Angaman (also Romanized as Angamān) is a village in Baranduz Rural District, in the Central District of Urmia County, West Azerbaijan Province, Iran. At the 2006 census, its population was 167, in 28 families.

References 

Populated places in Urmia County